The Gunderson Do-All Machine is a colorful, interconnected network of dozens of machines that have been cross-sectioned to reveal their internal operating mechanisms. It was designed by Mark Gunderson to illustrate mechanical concepts.

History and design 

The Gunderson Do-All Machine includes more than 30 individual machines that are linked together by an array of belts, gears, pulleys, and transmissions.  Collectively, they operate in a continuous chain reaction on the power of one  Whitte gas oil well engine, forming a kinetic sculpture. The entire network is mounted on a  flat bed trailer platform, so that it can be transported to engine shows, educational venues, and county fairs.  The combined weight of the trailer and all components is about 6000 pounds.

The Do-All's layout and design allows one to follow the chain reaction from machine to machine while observing the internal cogs, gears, and other components that make them work. The variety of machines include an automatically reversing worm gear, a water pump impellar, a governor/gas valve from a 20-horsepower (HP) JC engine, a blacksmith blower/bubble maker, the main line shaft and pulley from an antique corn grinder, a floating gear, a DC 110-volt generator and lights, a 38-to-1 gear reducer, a bicycle light generator, and a fan blower painted to look like a clown. Recent additions include a penny press that creates a commemorative Do-All Machine coin and a rotating satellite dish with sun and moon images painted on opposite sides.

Major engine components 

The Gunderson Do-All includes the following major engines that have been cut away to reveal their inner workings in action:

 Wright Twin Cyclone R-2600 1,700 horsepower radial engine from a B-25 Bomber
 Wankel Rotary Engine from a Mazda RX-7
 301 Cu in Pontiac V8 engine from a TransAm
 Jeep CJ5 Transmission

Gallery

See also 

 Pontiac TransAm

References 

 Gunderson R.  The Do-All Machine.  Gas Engine Magazine. December, 1999; Vol. 34:12, pages 16–18.

External links 
 
 Carter County Old-time Machinery and Antiques Annual Show, Ashland, Kentucky – story, interview, and slide show of self-trained mechanical engineer, Mark Gunderson, and the Gunderson Do-All Machine.
 Article
 Slideshow and interview
 Mark Gunderson’s Do-All Machine - Making its first appearance at Rough and Tumble Engineers Historical Association Threshermans Reunion
 Gunderson Do-All Machine
 Tri-State Old Engine Show – Portland, Indiana.  2003
 Tri-State Old Engine Show – Portland, Indiana.  2003 (more)

Machines
Engines
Radial engines